Bury the Hatchet is a 2010 documentary film directed by Aaron Walker.  The film is a portrait of the Mardi Gras Indians of New Orleans.

Synopsis
Bury the Hatchet is a portrait of three Mardi Gras Indian Big Chiefs of New Orleans, descendants of runaway slaves taken in by the Native Americans of the Louisiana bayous.  Once plagued by intertribal violence, today these African-American tribes take to the backstreets of New Orleans on Mardi Gras, dressed in elaborate Native American influenced costumes that they sew over the course of the year.  When tribes meet instead of attacking each other with hatchets and knives, they battle over which Chief has the prettiest suit.

The film follows Big Chiefs Alfred Doucette, Victor Harris and Monk Boudreaux over the course of five years, both pre and post Hurricane Katrina, and is an exploration of their art and philosophies, as well as their struggles within their communities: harassment by the police, violence amongst themselves, gentrification of their neighborhoods, uninterested youth, old age and natural disaster.

Filmmaker Aaron Walker gained intimate entry into this often hidden New Orleans experience and discovered not only a fascinating and beautiful culture but endearing characters and a truly dramatic narrative.  The film is the story of the unique and endangered culture of New Orleans they represent—as bearers of tradition, artists, musicians, and warriors who have laid down their weapons, but not their determination to survive as a people.

With a celebratory soundtrack of New Orleans music and additional scoring by pianist George Winston, the film is an intimate entry into this often hidden New Orleans experience.

Festivals
A selection of the Hot Docs International Documentary Festival in 2011, the film won the Best Louisiana Feature Award at the New Orleans Film festival and won the Grand Prize and Intangible Culture Award at the Royal Anthropological Institute Festival of Ethnographic Film in Leeds, England.  The film has screened at numerous other festivals, including the Florida Film Festival and the Margaret Mead Film Festival.

References

External links

JWR (James Wegg Review)

Mardi Gras Indians doc 'Bury the Hatchet' adds some color to New Orleans Film Festival
Mardi Gras Indian doc 'Bury the Hatchet' among 2010 New Orleans Film Festival award winners
Take 5: Hollywood South
Cine-Marais
Altaire Productions

2010 films
2010 documentary films
American documentary films
Documentary films about New Orleans
Mardi Gras in New Orleans
2010s English-language films
2010s American films